Omuta or Ōmuta can refer to:

Locations
Ōmuta, Fukuoka, a city in Fukuoka Prefecture, Japan
Ōmuta Station, a train station located in Omuta, Fukuoka Prefecture, Japan

Other
Ōmuta murders, a series of murders committed by the Kitamura-gumi yakuza family in Japan
Omuta, a planet in The Night's Dawn Trilogy by Peter F. Hamilton

See also
Shin-Ōmuta Station, a shinkansen train station located in Ōmuta, Fukuoka, Japan
Tenjin Ōmuta Line, a heavy rail line in Fukuoka Prefecture, Japan